Serra do Coqueiro is a mountain range in the border of Brazilian states of Rio Grande do Norte, Ceará and Paraíba. An unnamed peak at Venha-Ver is the highest point in Rio Grande do Norte, reaching .

References 

Landforms of Rio Grande do Norte
Landforms of Ceará
Landforms of Paraíba
Coqueiro
Highest points of Brazilian states